Mohamed Mohsen Abo Gresha محمد محسن أبو جريشة (born August 4, 1981) is an Egyptian footballer. He is currently contracted with Telephonat Bani Sweif.

Career
In 2007, Mohsen Abo Gresha was included in the Egyptian national squad for the African Cup of Nations qualifiers. In February 2008, he started a one-year loan spell at the Chinese club Zhejiang Lucheng.

Managerial statistics

References

External links

1981 births
Living people
Egyptian footballers
2009 FIFA Confederations Cup players
Zhejiang Professional F.C. players
Expatriate footballers in China
Chinese Super League players
Ismaily SC players
Egyptian Premier League players
Association football forwards
Egypt international footballers
Egyptian expatriate footballers
Egyptian expatriate sportspeople in China
Ittihad El Shorta SC players
Telephonat Beni Suef SC players
El Qanah FC players